Castle Hill is the name given to the once substantial motte and bailey, perhaps double bailey, apparently associated with the then new town of Castle Carlton in the county of Lincolnshire, some 7 miles south-east of Louth, between the villages of North and South Reston.

It was founded in the 12th century by Hugh Bardolf.

References

Fry, Plantagenet Somerset, The David & Charles Book of Castles, David & Charles, 1980. 

Castles in Lincolnshire